Església de Sant Serni de Llorts  is a church located in Llorts, Ordino Parish, Andorra. It is a heritage property registered in the Cultural Heritage of Andorra. It was built in the 17th century.

References

Ordino
Roman Catholic churches in Andorra
Cultural Heritage of Andorra